Jacques Archambault (c. 1604 – February 15, 1688) was a French colonist in Montreal. He was born in Dompierre-sur-Mer, where he was baptized.

Archambault married (around 1629) Françoise Tourault, with whom he had many children. All Archambaults (and descendants) now living in North America are his descendants, as no other Archambault ever emigrated from France.

A plate in the back of the Pointe-à-Callière Museum of Montreal commemorates his digging the first water well, near what is now known as Place-d'Armes, on October 11, 1658, upon request by Paul de Chomedey de Maisonneuve.

List of children
 Madeleine Archambault ou Aubry (1621–?);
 Denis Archambault (1630–1651);
 Anne Archambault (1631–1699);
 Jacquette-Françoise Archambault (1632–1700);
 N.N. Archambault (1634–?);
 Marie Archambault (1636–1719);
 Marie-Anne Archambault (1638–1685);
 Louise Archambault (1640–1640);
 and Laurent Archambault (1642–1730).

Notes

1600s births
1688 deaths
Colonists of Fort Ville-Marie
People of New France